Mohamed Hassan Moussa (born 27 December 1921) was an Egyptian wrestler. He competed at the 1948 Summer Olympics and the 1952 Summer Olympics.

References

External links
 

1921 births
Possibly living people
Egyptian male sport wrestlers
Olympic wrestlers of Egypt
Wrestlers at the 1948 Summer Olympics
Wrestlers at the 1952 Summer Olympics
Place of birth missing
20th-century Egyptian people